Charles Dantonja Bennett (born April 4, 1983) is a former American football defensive end. He was drafted by the Tampa Bay Buccaneers in the seventh round of the 2006 NFL Draft. He played college football at Clemson.

Bennett was also a member of the Tennessee Titans and Las Vegas Locomotives.

Professional career

Las Vegas Locomotives
Bennett was signed by the Las Vegas Locomotives of the United Football League on September 29, 2009.

External links
Clemson Tigers bio
Tampa Bay Buccaneers bio

1983 births
Living people
People from Camden, South Carolina
Players of American football from South Carolina
American football defensive ends
Clemson Tigers football players
Tampa Bay Buccaneers players
Tennessee Titans players
Las Vegas Locomotives players